Nicephorus is a genus of parasitic flies in the family Tachinidae. There is one described species in Nicephorus, N. floridensis.

Distribution
United States.

References

Dexiinae
Diptera of North America
Tachinidae genera
Monotypic Brachycera genera